Eduard Dmitrievich Pleske (25 October 1852 – 9 May 1904) was a Russo-German statesman.

Career 
Eduard Pleske was born into a noble family in the Russian Empire. He was educated in the Imperial Alexander Lyceum. After graduation, he joined the Ministry of Finance. Pleske was Assistant Director and later Director of the Special Credit Office.

Eduard Pleske also held the position of Head of the State Bank of the Russian Empire, and his signature can be seen in many Russian banknotes dated 1895–1899.

He was appointed Assistant Minister of Finance under Sergei Witte in 1903. He succeeded Witte on 16 August 1903 after Witte was shunted aside to the position of Chairman of the Committee of Ministers. He died in office on the 4 February 1904. He was also briefly a member of the Imperial State Council in 1904.

Eduard Pleske published in 1885, Reference Guide to Tax collectors, State Chambers and Treasuries

References

External links 
 Eduard Pleske signature on Russian banknotes

1852 births
1904 deaths
Bankers from the Russian Empire
Central bankers
Members of the State Council (Russian Empire)
Finance ministers of Russia
Privy Councillor (Russian Empire)